Kayne Tremills (born 23 January 1987) is an Australian television presenter best known for his role as a host on Australian children's television programme Studio 3, which was broadcast on ABC3.

Career
In 2009, the ABC launched a nationwide campaign, called Me on 3. The goal was to find two faces for a new television channel, ABC3. The competition was entered by 5700 people. Tremills was chosen, along with Amberley Lobo, to host children's show Studio 3. In 2010, he worked on the 2010 Schools Spectacular with co-host Amberley Lobo and John Foreman.

Tremills has hosted the Australian version of Splatalot! with Prank Patrol host Scott Tweedie, My Great Big Adventure a show which tackles many of life's problems. He also hosted Bushwhacked! alongside Australia star Brandon Walters and later Kamil Elis, where they traverse various locations of Australia in an attempt to complete episodic missions. He hosted coverage of the 2013 New Year's Eve Celebration. In 2014 he also hosted Antarctica: Secrets from the Giant Freezer, filmed in Antarctica.

He has also guest starred in Prank Patrol, Good Game: Spawn Point and You're Skitting Me, later being the announcer in the Hits For Kids compilation albums television ads in 2014–present. In 2019, he once again became a presenter to host a new game show called Get It Together! on ABC Me.

Personal life
Tremills is married to  actress Saskia Hampele.

References

1987 births
Living people
Australian children's television presenters
Television personalities from Melbourne